Maria Aleksandrovna Duyunova (born 30 April 1990 in Leningrad, RSFSR, USSR) is a Russian female curler.

Awards
 World Mixed Curling Championship: gold (2016).
 Russian Women's Curling Championship: silver (2008, 2009).
 Russian Mixed Curling Championship: gold (2013, 2016, 2017), silver (2015).
 Russian Mixed Curling Cup: gold (2014), bronze (2017).
 International Class Master of Sports of Russia (curling, 2016).

Teams and events

Women's

Mixed

Mixed doubles

References

External links

Living people
1990 births
Curlers from Saint Petersburg
Russian female curlers
Russian curling champions
World mixed curling champions
Competitors at the 2017 Winter Universiade
Universiade medalists in curling
Universiade silver medalists for Russia